Chromium(II) selenide is an inorganic compound with the chemical formula CrSe.

References

Chromium(II) compounds
Selenides
Nickel arsenide structure type